Royal albatross may refer to:

Birds
 Northern royal albatross, Diomedea sanfordi
 Southern royal albatross, Diomedea epomophora

Ships
 Royal Albatross (ship), a luxury tall ship located at Sentosa, Singapore